Jesus as myth may refer to:
Christ myth theory, the position that Jesus is a figure constructed from various mythologies
Jesus Christ in comparative mythology, examination of similarities between the figure of Jesus and figures in various ancient mythologies

See also
Historicity of Jesus
Historical Jesus
Jesus
Cultural and historical background of Jesus